Al Qaysareyah Market is an old market in the city of Kirkuk in Iraq, located near the Kirkuk Citadel. Sources claim it was built in 1855 during the Ottoman Empire era.

The market's layout symbolizes the hours, days, and months of the year. The market consist of 365 stores which symbolize the days of the year, has 12 small rooms in its second flour which symbolize the 12 months of the year, has 24 aisles which symbolize the hours of the day and has 7 doors which symbolizes the days of the week. The market was renovated in 1978.

Notes

Buildings and structures in Kirkuk
Souqs
Commercial buildings completed in 1855
1855 establishments in the Ottoman Empire